Light the Fuse... Sartana Is Coming (lit. "Cloud of dust... cry of death... Sartana is coming", also known as Gunman in Town and Run, Man, Run... Sartana's in Town) is a 1970 Italian-Spanish Spaghetti Western film directed by Giuliano Carnimeo and starring Gianni Garko as Sartana.

Plot

After killing a corrupt sheriff and his deputies in the town of Sandy Creek, Sartana voluntarily surrenders himself to Everglades Penitentiary under the guise of a convict with the purpose of meeting a man called Granville who is imprisoned there. Creating diversions well enough after breaking free, Sartana helps Granville escape from the prison and learns of the deal that got him in custody of the law in the first place. Granville claims to have been double-crossed by his casino business partner, Horace Johnson, in a deal with an outlaw named Monk and Joe, the younger brother of corrupt sheriff Manassas Jim. The deal was for Monk to obtain two million dollars in counterfeit money from Joe in exchange for half a million dollars in gold, and Johnson's role, as a banker, was to legalize the transaction, except that he killed both Monk's representative and Joe and framed Granville for it. However, Johnson was found dead in the casino while the counterfeit money and the bag of gold disappeared, thus leaving Granville as the prime suspect who was captured and imprisoned by Manassas Jim.

Granville claims he doesn't know where the loot is hidden, but knows it is somewhere in the town of Mansfield. He asks Sartana to help him locate the gold, with the intention of splitting it with him, to which the latter seemingly agrees. Sartana goes to Mansfield alone, only to learn that there are more people after the gold with several different versions of how the murders in the casino took place. Manassas Jim's story is identical to that of Granville's, while Monk insists he witnessed only two lying corpses in the gambling house and insinuates that the sheriff found and killed Johnson, and placed his body nearby the other two. Along the way, Sartana also meets Belle, the supposed widow of Johnson, who tells him her late husband used her money in dirty deals, claiming ownership of the legitimate currency in return. Sartana informs each of them individually that he plans to split the gold with them, without the others knowing about it, and sends them to Sonora where Granville is hiding, with the purpose of manipulating them against one another. His plan succeeds and Granville makes it out alive during the shootout.

An elderly man named Plonplon, whom Sartana befriended in Mansfield for his own gains, is found murdered by a mysterious figure in a stable after he deduces where the gold is hidden. As Sartana arrives to find the body, the same person makes an unsuccessful attempt on his life, but flees the scene before getting discovered. Sartana pays Belle a visit in search for clues, only to find out that her late husband Johnson's boots are covered in crystalline dirt. He travels to the graveyard to dig up Joe's grave and examine his boots, which confirms his suspicion regarding the location of the counterfeit money. Sartana comes across Sam Puttnam, an undercover federal agent who also is looking for the gold, believing it is a property of the U.S. government. Puttnam examines the crystalline dirt on the boots and tells Sartana to rendezvous with him at the town's Turkish bath. But before Sartana could make it to the meeting place, he finds Puttnam murdered, with his last uttered word being "Apache". Manassas Jim's men ambush Sartana at the Turkish bath, but he manages to kill them all and flees to the nearest Apache cave.

Sartana confronts Manassas Jim at the Apache cave, kills him and burns the counterfeit money. He travels back to Mansfield to strike a deal with Belle whom he tells that he has found out where the gold is. Belle, however, secretly informs Monk in hopes of splitting the gold with him if he kills Sartana. Sartana, heavily prepared and knowing that Belle would easily betray him to what she thought would be the stronger side, awaits the arrival of Monk along with his gang in Mansfield. A gunfight ensues and Sartana comes out on top. It is later revealed that Granville and Belle, who were having an affair behind Johnson's back, were the orchestrators of the entire scheme. When Belle secretly attempts to shoot Granville with her hidden derringer pistol, the same weapon that murdered Plonplon (thus revealing her as the mysterious figure), Granville shoots her first, having seen through her  double-cross. Upon his arrival at the casino, Sartana deduces Granville's scheme: Johnson had never betrayed him but was played for a fool by Granville himself, who  later killed him after hiding the loot in separate locations, with the gold being at the gambling house. Left with no cards to play, Granville faces Sartana in a standoff and is killed. Sartana takes the half-million dollars in gold and departs Mansfield.

Cast

Release
Light the Fuse... Sartana Is Coming was released on 24 December 1970.

Reception
In a contemporary review, Verina Glaessner (Monthly Film Bulletin) reviewed an 89 minute English-dubbed version of the film titled Gunman in Town. Glaessner found the film to be "a thickly and incomprehensibly plotted Western" with "various devices resurrected from the Dollar films help to make it reasonably watchable".

References

External links

Spanish Western (genre) films
Spaghetti Western films
1970 Western (genre) films
1970 films
Films directed by Giuliano Carnimeo
Films with screenplays by Ernesto Gastaldi
Films scored by Bruno Nicolai
1970s Italian films
1970s Italian-language films
Italian-language Spanish films